CSX Transportation's Carters Subdivision is a segment of CSX's A Line running from Poinciana southwest to Lakeland.  The Carters Subdivision ends just west of Downtown Lakeland at Lakeland Junction, where it continues west as the Lakeland Subdivision and connects to the Vitis Subdivision.

Another important junction on the line is Auburndale Interlocking, just west of Auburndale.  Here, the line connects with the Auburndale Subdivision, CSX's only line to South Florida and the Miami area.  Freight trains bound for Miami from the rest of the country generally come off the Vitis Subdivision and run the Carters Subdivision to reach Miami.  The McDonald Connection track connects the Carters Subdivision from the south with the Auburndale Subdivision and the Can Yard Lead connects it in the north direction.

Operation
Much of the freight service on the Carters Subdivision is to and from the Miami area and customers down the Auburndale Subdivision.  Local freight also runs on the line with a number of customers located on the Park Spur just east of Lakeland.  Local freight bound for Taft Yard and customers on the Central Florida Rail Corridor in the Orlando area also run the line.  No through freight to northern Florida runs on the Central Florida Rail Corridor.

The Carters Subdivision also hosts Amtrak's Silver Meteor and Silver Star trains daily.  The Silver Star trains run the entire route to reach Tampa, while both trains run to Auburndale Interlocking to turn towards Miami.

In addition to the main line, there are also some notable spur lines along the Carters Subdivision.  The CH Spur begins at the main line just east of Lakeland station and runs south through an industrial area along US 98 to Eaton Park.  Park Spur begins at the main line just west of Carters and runs north to serve the McIntosh Power Plant.  Another spur also runs through Haines City.

History

The Carters Subdivision first began service in 1884 and was built as part of Henry B. Plant's South Florida Railroad, which extended from Sanford to Tampa.  Crews building the line from each end met up and completed the line just east of Lakeland at a location called Carter's Kill, which the Carters Subdivision is named for.  The South Florida Railroad was absorbed by the Atlantic Coast Line Railroad in 1902, which became their main line.

The CH Spur was originally the south leg of South Florida Railroad's Pemberton Ferry Branch (the Vitis Subdivision was the north leg).  The south leg would later be the northernmost segment of the Atlantic Coast Line's Lakeland–Fort Myers Line.  The CH Spur was abandoned south of Eaton Park in the 1980s.  The spur through Haines City was built by the Atlantic Coast Line in 1910 as the Haines City Branch, which at one point extended as far south as Everglades City.

The Atlantic Coast Line became part of CSX Transportation by 1986.  Prior to 2011, the Carters Subdivision's north end was at Auburndale Interlocking and the A Line north of Auburndale Interlocking was part of the Sanford Subdivision.  After CSX sold the A Line north of Poinciana to the Florida Department of Transportation to create the Central Florida Rail Corridor, the Sanford Subdivision was truncated at Deland and the Carters Subdivision designation was extended up the A Line to Poinciana.

See also
 List of CSX Transportation lines

References

CSX Transportation lines
Florida railroads
Rail infrastructure in Florida
Transportation in Polk County, Florida
Transportation in Osceola County, Florida